Šargovac is a village in the municipality of Banja Luka (present-day Republika Srpska, Bosnia and Herzegovina).

During World War II, on 7 February 1942, Ustaše paramilitaries, led by a Franciscan friar, Miroslav Filipović (aka Tomislav Filipović-Majstorović), killed more than 2,300 Serbs (among them 500 children) in Drakulić, Motike, and Šargovac.

References

Villages in Republika Srpska
Populated places in Banja Luka